Harnisch is a German surname. Notable people with the surname include:

Henning Harnisch (born 1968), German basketball player
Pete Harnisch (born 1966), American baseball player
Sebastian Harnisch (born 1967), German political scientist
Thomas Harnisch (born 1947), American politician and lawyer
Wilhelm Harnisch, Australian chief executive

German-language surnames